Derek John Marks (15 January 1921 – 8 February 1975) was Editor of the Daily Express between 1965 and 1971. He was educated at Seaford College.

References

   

1921 births
1975 deaths
People educated at Seaford College
British male journalists
British newspaper editors
Daily Express people